Rauno Nurger (born 24 November 1993) is an Estonian basketball player for Kalev/Cramo of the Estonian League and VTB United League. He is a 2.08 m (6 ft 10 in) tall power forward and center. Nurger played college basketball for the Wichita State Shockers.

High school career
Nurger played for Sunrise Christian Academy in Wichita, Kansas. He averaged 10 points and 9 rebounds for the postgraduate team during 2013–14 season.

College career
Nurger originally signed with Ole Miss but was released from his letter of intent following a coaching change. He then committed to Wichita State in the early summer of 2014. In his freshman year Nurger appeared in 24 games off the bench, averaging 2.3 points and 1.2 rebounds in 8.8 minutes. He scored four points in his collegiate debut against New Mexico State on November 11, 2014 and also played a season-high 20 minutes. Nurger scored a season-high 15 points on 5-of-9 shooting against Saint Louis on December 6, 2014. As a sophomore he had planned to redshirt the 2015–16 season while focusing on strength and skill development but was forced into duty after an injury to senior Anton Grady on November 27, 2015. He removed his redshirt in the season’s sixth game on November 29, 2015 against Iowa. In his sophomore year Nurger appeared in 28 games off the bench, averaging 1.6 points and 1.2 rebounds in 7.6 minutes. In his junior year Nurger appeared in all 36 games with five starts as he averaged 5.0 points and 2.7 rebounds in 14.1 minutes. He was ranked third on the team with 15 blocks. Noted as an effective screener and three-point sniper (13-of-28) he was the first Shocker's player off the bench in 15 games and was chosen to the MVC All-Bench Team selection. Nurger helped Wichita State win the 2017 Missouri Valley Conference tournament as they defeated Illinois State 71–51 in the championship game. Nurger ended his college career as one of nine Shockers to participate in more than 100 career victories as Wichita State.

|}

Professional career
As a teenager, Nurger played two seasons in the Estonian League for Rapla and Tallinna Kalev teams. On August 16, 2018, he signed with Peñas Huesca of the LEB Oro. He stayed in Spain for the next season playing for Leche Río Breogán of the LEB Oro. In July 2020 he signed with Kalev/Cramo and returned to his native Estonia. In September 2022, he went back to play in LEB Oro, this time for Gipuzkoa Basket.

National team career
Nurger made his debut for the Estonian national team on 29 June 2018, in a 2019 FIBA Basketball World Cup qualifier against Great Britain, scoring 8 points in a 65–74 away defeat.

Career statistics

College

|-
| style="text-align:left;"| 2014–15
| style="text-align:left;"| Wichita State
| 24 || 0 || 8.8 || .474 || .278 || .700 || 1.2 || .2 || .1 || .4 || 2.3
|-
| style="text-align:left;"| 2015–16
| style="text-align:left;"| Wichita State
| 28 || 0 || 7.6 || .421 || .083 || .611 || 1.2 || .1 || .1 || .3 || 1.6
|-
| style="text-align:left;"| 2016–17
| style="text-align:left;"| Wichita State

| 36 || 5 || 14.1 || .525 || .464 || .722 || 2.8 || .6 || .1 || .4 || 5.0
|-
| style="text-align:left;"| 2017–18
| style="text-align:left;"| Wichita State
| 33 || 2 || 13.4 || .514 || .296 || .706 || 2.8 || .5 || .2 || .4 || 4.4
|- class="sortbottom"
| style="text-align:center;" colspan="2"| Career
|121 || 7 || 11.4 || .502 || .318 || .698 || 2.1 || .4 || .1 || .4 || 3.5

Domestic leagues

Estonia national team

|-
| style="text-align:left;"| 2012
| style="text-align:left;"| 2012 FIBA Europe Under-20 Championship
| style="text-align:left;"| Estonia U-20
| 9 || 8 || 28.0 || .449 || .000 || .605 || 5.7 || .8 || .4 || 1.4 || 10.3
|-
| style="text-align:left;"| 2013
| style="text-align:left;"| 2013 FIBA Europe Under-20 Championship
| style="text-align:left;"| Estonia U-20
| 9 || 8 || 25.6 || .535 || .250 || .467 || 5.4 || .9 || .3 || 1.8 || 10.2
|-
| style="text-align:left;"| 2018–19
| style="text-align:left;"| 2019 Basketball World Cup Qualification
| style="text-align:left;"| Estonia
| 6 || 2 || 15.3 || .522 || .250 || .625 || 2.7 || .0 || .3 || .3 || 5.0
|-
| style="text-align:left;"| 2020
| style="text-align:left;"| EuroBasket 2022 qualification
| style="text-align:left;"| Estonia
| 2 ||   || 10.1 || .750 || - || 1.000 || 3.5 || .0 || .0 || .0 || 4.0

References

External links

Rauno Nurger at basket.ee
Rauno Nurger at FIBA.com
ESPN.com profile

1993 births
Living people
BC Tallinn Kalev players
CB Peñas Huesca players
BC Kalev/Cramo players
Centers (basketball)
Estonian expatriate basketball people in Spain
Estonian expatriate basketball people in the United States
Estonian men's basketball players
Korvpalli Meistriliiga players
People from Keila
Power forwards (basketball)
Rapla KK players
Wichita State Shockers men's basketball players